Denmark competed at the 1928 Summer Olympics in Amsterdam, Netherlands. 91 competitors (82 men and 9 women) took part in 55 events in 14 sports.

Medalists

Aquatics

Diving

1 diver, a woman, represented Denmark in 1928. It was the nation's third appearance in the sport. Edith Nielsen, who had taken 4th place in the 10 metre platform event in 1924, competed again. This time, she did not advance out of the preliminary groups. She finished 6th in her group.

Swimming

Five swimmers, all women, represented Denmark in 1928. It was the nation's 5th appearance in the sport. Jacobsen was the only Danish swimmer to advance to an event final; she placed 4th in the 200 metre breaststroke.

Athletics

10 athletes, all men, represented Denmark in 1928. It was the nation's 7th appearance in the sport as well as the Games. None of the Danish athletes advanced past the initial round of their events. Nikolajsen's 10th place finish in the pole vault was the best ranking for Denmark in athletics in Amsterdam.

 Track and road events

 Field events

Boxing

Six boxers represented Denmark in 1928. The sport was open to men only. It was Denmark's 4th appearance in Olympic boxing. Nielsen, the defending champion in the lightweight, was one of two Danish boxers to reach the semifinals, along with Michaelsen. Both men lost there. Michaelsen earned Denmark's only boxing medal in 1928 by winning the subsequent bronze medal bout; Nielsen lost his bronze medal bout to finish fourth.

Cycling

Five cyclists, all men, represented Denmark in 1928. It was the nation's 4th appearance in the sport. Prior to 1928, Denmark's best result in the sport had been a silver medal in the tandem in 1924. Willy Hansen, one of the members of that tandem, won Denmark's first Olympic cycling championship in the track time trial. Two days later, the road race team, led by Henry Hansen, won the second and third gold medals for Denmark in cycling with a team victory and an individual championship for Hansen. Willy Hansen also earned a bronze medal in the sprint, finishing his Olympic career with one medal of each color.

Road cycling

Track cycling

 Time trial

 Match races

Equestrian

Three equestrians, all men, represented Denmark in 1928. It was the nation's 3rd appearance in the sport. One rider, Magnus Fog, competed in the dressage competition, finishing in 16th place. Denmark sent two riders in eventing; Peder Jensen finished 9th while Cai Gundelach did not finish.

Dressage

Eventing

Fencing

Ten fencers, seven men and three women, represented Denmark in 1928. It was the nation's 7th appearance in the sport as well as the Games. Ivan Joseph Martin Osiier fenced in his 5th Olympics (he would compete twice more, in 1932 and 1948). For the first time since 1908, no Danish fencers advanced to the finals.

Field hockey

Denmark competed in men's field hockey for the second time in 1928. The defending silver medalist, Denmark won its first two matches before falling to India and Belgium in group play to finish 3rd in their group. The team shared 5th place overall with the 3rd-place team in the other group, France.

 Summary

Men's tournament

 Team roster

 Group play

Modern pentathlon

Two pentathletes, both men, represented Denmark in 1928. It was the nation's fourth appearance in the sport. Denmark was one of five nations to have competed in each edition of the Olympic modern pentathlon. Both of the Danish pentathletes had competed previously in 1924, with Jensen placing 6th and Olsen 15th. The two started off well, placing 4th and 2nd in the shooting event. Olsen, however, finished last in the swimming portion. Jensen fared better in the pool, but still fell well beyond the leaders. Strong performances by both in fencing (with Jensen leading the entire group) made up some ground and put Jensen in contention for the podium. Neither man was able to achieve more than a middle-of-the-pack result in running or equestrian, however, and they finished in 10th (Jensen) and 14th (Olsen) overall among the 37 competitors.

Rowing

Ten rowers, all men, represented Denmark in 1928. It was the nation's 3rd appearance in the sport, and first since 1920. Denmark entered two boats, a single scull and an eight. Both boats had the same result: a first-round loss, advancement through the first repechage, and a second-round loss eliminating the boat.

Sailing

Five sailors, all men, represented Denmark in 1928. It was the nation's third appearance in the sport. For the third time, Denmark took the silver medal in the 6 metre class. The Hi-Hi barely qualified for the final three races (only boats which had placed at least 3rd in one of the first four races continued to compete), but finished by winning both the sixth and seventh race. This put the boat in second place behind the Norwegian Norna, which had won 3 races, and ahead of the Estonian Tutti V, which had won 1. In the dinghy class, Andersen took 2nd in the first race and 4th in the next three. This gave him enough net points to survive the 10-boat cut in that event. His results in the fifth and sixth races did not improve his position, however, and he did not start the seventh and eighth. He ultimately finished in seventh place, behind the Italian boat (which had two 2nd-place finished) and ahead of the British boat (which matched Andersen's single 2nd-place, but had only one 4th-place finish to his three). 

 Dinghy

 6 metre and 8 metre classes

Weightlifting

One male weightlifter represented Denmark in 1928. It was the nation's third appearance in the sport and first since 1920. Nissen competed in the lightweight class, finishing last of the 16 men who finished the competition (2 did not finish).

Wrestling

Seven wrestlers, all men, represented Denmark in 1928. It was the nation's 5th appearance in the sport. Denmark had wrestlers in 2 of the 7 freestyle weight classes and all 6 of the Greco-Roman weight classes, with Johannes Jacobsen competing in both styles.

Both Danish freestyle wrestlers lost in the round of 16. Jørgensen, however, had lost to the eventual gold medalist and therefore advanced to the silver medal tournament under the Bergvall system in use at the time. He won his semifinal bout there, but lost in the silver medal final. (It is not clear why he did not compete in the bronze medal tournament.)

Jacobsen had the best performance among the Greco-Roman wrestlers, winning his first three bouts before two consecutive losses (separated by a bye) put him over the 5 point elimination threshold. He finished in 4th place. Three other Danish wrestlers earned two wins before being eliminated. Larsen was the only Dane to not win a single bout in Greco-Roman.

Freestyle wrestling

Greco-Roman wrestling

Art competitions

References

External links
Official Olympic Reports
International Olympic Committee results database

Nations at the 1928 Summer Olympics
1928
Summer Olympics